The Arizona Cardinals are a professional American football team based in Glendale, Arizona. The Cardinals compete in the National Football League (NFL) as a member of the league's National Football Conference (NFC) West division. The team began as the Morgan Athletic Club in 1898 in Chicago, Illinois. The team's second name was the Racine Normals, since it played at Normal Field on Racine Street. In 1901, they were renamed to the Racine Street Cardinals, a name that came from the University of Chicago jerseys that the team used, which were described as "Cardinal red". The team has played their home games at the State Farm Stadium since 2006 and is the oldest franchise in the NFL.

The team has moved to numerous cities during its history. After staying in Chicago from 1920 to 1959, it moved to St. Louis, Missouri and remained there from 1960 to 1987. It played in Tempe, Arizona, from 1988 to 2005, before eventually settling in Glendale, Arizona in 2006, where it now resides. Since 1920, two Cardinals coaches have won the NFL Championship: Norman Barry in 1925 and Jimmy Conzelman in 1947. Six other coaches—Don Coryell, Jim Hanifan, Vince Tobin, Ken Whisenhunt, Bruce Arians, and Kliff Kingsbury—have led the Cardinals to the playoffs, and in 2009 they went to the  Super Bowl.

There have been 43 head coaches for the Cardinals franchise since it became a professional team in 1920; fourteen of the team's coaches are former Cardinals players. Ernie Nevers and Jimmy Conzelman are the only coaches to have had more than one tenure with the team. Pop Ivy and Gene Stallings both coached the team during its move from one city to another. Cardinals coach Roy Andrews is tied for the lowest winning percentage among the team's coaches (.000), having lost the only game he coached in the 1931 season. Co-coach Walt Kiesling lost all ten games he coached in 1943, when the team merged with the Steelers during World War II and was known as Card-Pitt. Co-coaches Ray Willsey, Ray Prochaska, and Chuck Drulis have the highest winning percentage among Cardinals coaches (1.000). The team's all-time leader in games coached is Ken Whisenhunt, who was hired on January 14, 2007, with 96. Whisenhunt was fired on December 31, 2012, after the Cardinals recorded a 5–11 record in 2012. The all-time leader in wins is Bruce Arians with fifty, including one playoff victory.

Key

Coaches
 Note: The list begins in 1920, when the Cardinals became a professional team. Statistics are accurate through the end of the 2022 NFL season.

Notes

References

 
Arizona Cardinals
Head coaches